The Hizon-Singian House is a Bahay na Bato heritage house located in the City of San Fernando, Pampanga. Built in 1870 by the couple Don Anacleto Hizon, gobernadorcillo of San Fernando from 1877-1879 and 1886-1887, and Victoria Singian de Miranda y de Ocampo. Inherited by their daughter Victoria Hizon y Singian who was married to Godofredo Rodriguez y Yabut from Bacolor. It was occupied during the 1896 revolution by Spanish General Antonio Ruiz Serralde, appropriated by the Japanese Imperial Army to serve as a military hospital and barracks from 1943 to 1944, and served as headquarters of American General Walter Krueger of the 6th American Army during the liberation period until the end of 1945. Inherited by their son, the late Gerry Catalino Rodriguez Y Hizon, former president of the Pampanga Sugar Development Company (PASUDECO), who was married to Aurora Angeles.  This bahay na bato of the Spanish colonial period was declared a Heritage House by the National Historical Institute on 27 January 2003 by virtue of Resolution No. 4, S. 2003.

Buildings and structures in San Fernando, Pampanga
Landmarks in the Philippines
Heritage Houses in the Philippines